League 8 of the WABA League, or Superleague, took place between 18 January 2017 and 15 March 2017.

The four best ranked teams advanced to the Final Four. The points against teams from the same preliminary round were taken over.

Standings

Fixtures and results
All times given below are in Central European Time (for the match played in Bulgaria is time expressed in Eastern European Time).

Game 1

Game 2

Game 3

Game 4

Game 5

Game 6

Game 7

Game 8

References

External links
Official website

League 8
2016–17 in Serbian basketball
2016–17 in Bosnia and Herzegovina basketball
2016–17 in Montenegrin basketball
2016–17 in Bulgarian basketball
2016–17 in Slovenian basketball